Richard Roe, also Rowe, (c.1640 – 1718) of Epperstone was one of the earliest clockmakers in Nottinghamshire.

Life

He married on 12 August 1660 in Holy Trinity Church, Lambley to Mary. He became churchwarden at Holy Cross Church, Epperstone in 1668 but was a Quaker.

He produced several clocks, known as door frame clocks, for churches in Nottinghamshire.

He is also known to have produced some lantern clocks.

He was buried at Clipston, Nottinghamshire on 25 August 1718.

Works

Door frame clocks
St. Peter and St. Paul's Church, Shelford 1680 (Replaced in 1880. Whereabouts unknown.)
St Margaret's Church, Owthorpe 1680
Church of St. John of Beverley, Whatton 1683 (Probably removed in 1910. Whereabouts unknown.)
St Mary's Church, East Leake 1683 (not confirmed as Richard Roe, but similar in style)
Church of St. Mary Magdalene, Hucknall 1685
Church of St. Mary the Virgin, Plumtree 1686 (now at the British Horological Institute, Upton Hall) removed from Plumtree in 1889.
Holy Cross Church, Epperstone 1688 (Removed in 1854. Whereabouts unknown.)
St. Giles' Church, Cropwell Bishop 1694 (now in Nottingham Industrial Museum).
St Swithin’s Church, Wellow about 1699
St Nicholas' Church, Nottingham 1699 (Removed in 1830. Whereabouts unknown.)
St Michael's Church, Linby, 1700
St Mary's Church, Nottingham 1707 (removed in 1807, now in St Mary's Church, Staunton in the Vale).
Priory Church of St Peter, Thurgarton date unknown. Removed in 1879.

References

English clockmakers
1640s births
1718 deaths
People from Epperstone
English Quakers
Turret clock makers of the United Kingdom